ARCOM may refer to:

Army Commendation Medal
Regulatory Authority for Audiovisual and Digital Communication